The 1970 Mexican Grand Prix was a Formula One motor race held at the Ciudad Deportiva Magdalena Mixhuca in Mexico City on October 25, 1970. It was race 13 of 13 in both the 1970 World Championship of Drivers and the 1970 International Cup for Formula One Manufacturers. The 65-lap race was won by Ferrari driver Jacky Ickx after he started from third position. His teammate Clay Regazzoni finished second and McLaren driver Denny Hulme came in third. 

Ickx was not able to close the points gap to the late Jochen Rindt in the final races of the season, and as result, Rindt became the only driver ever to win the championship posthumously.

Race report 

The crowd of 200,000 was difficult to control and almost forced the cancellation of the race. They were crammed in front of the guard-rails, sat at the trackside and ran across the track itself. Despite appeals from Jackie Stewart and local hero Pedro Rodríguez they still remained troublesome.

From the start, Jacky Ickx led from Stewart and Clay Regazzoni, but dropped back with steering column trouble. Later, a collision with a dog which had escaped onto the track damaged Stewart's suspension and forced his retirement, leaving the Ferraris dominant in first and second. Jack Brabham retired from third place in his final Grand Prix when the engine blew on lap 53. The Ferraris romped home with Ickx leading Regazzoni and Denny Hulme claiming the third podium spot.

The crowd control issues led to the Mexican Grand Prix being dropped from the 1971 calendar. It returned to the Formula One calendar fifteen years later in 1986.

Qualifying

Qualifying classification

Race

Classification

Championship standings after the race

Drivers' Championship standings

Constructors' Championship standings

Note: Only the top five positions are included for both sets of standings. Only the best 6 results from the first 7 rounds and the best 5 results from the last 6 rounds counted towards the Championship. Numbers without parentheses are Championship points; numbers in parentheses are total points scored.

References

Mexican Grand Prix
Mexican Grand Prix
1970 in Mexican motorsport
October 1970 sports events in Mexico